Oleksandr Shpyn (born March 7, 1996) is a Ukrainian male acrobatic gymnast. Along with partner, Yelyzaveta Vasylyga, he finished 6th in the 2014 Acrobatic Gymnastics World Championships.

References

1996 births
Living people
Ukrainian acrobatic gymnasts
Male acrobatic gymnasts
European Games competitors for Ukraine
Gymnasts at the 2015 European Games